The Order of Nine Angles (ONA or O9A) is a Satanic and left-hand path occultist group which is based in the United Kingdom, and associated groups are based in other parts of the world. Claiming to have been established in the 1960s, it rose to public recognition in the early 1980s, attracting attention for its neo-Nazi ideology and activism. Describing its approach as "Traditional Satanism", it has also been identified as exhibiting Hermetic and modern Pagan elements in its beliefs by academic researchers.

According to the Order's own claims, it was established in the Welsh Marches of Western England during the late 1960s by a woman who had previously been involved in a secretive pre-Christian sect which survived in the region. This account also states that in 1973 a man named "Anton Long" was initiated into the group, subsequently becoming its grand master. Several academic commentators to have studied the ONA express the view that the name "Anton Long" is probably the pseudonym of the British neo-Nazi activist David Myatt, although Myatt has denied that this is the case. From the late 1970s onward, Long authored books and articles which propagated the Order's ideas, and in 1988 it began publishing its own journal, Fenrir. Through these ventures it established links with other neo-Nazi Satanist groups around the world, furthering its cause through embracing the Internet in the 2000s.

The ONA promotes the idea that human history can be divided into a series of aeons, each of which contains a corresponding human civilization. It expresses the view that the current aeonic civilization is that of the Western world, but it claims that the evolution of this society is threatened by the "Magian/Nazarene" influence of the Judeo-Christian religion, which the Order seeks to combat in order to establish a militaristic new social order, which it calls the "Imperium". According to Order teachings, this is necessary in order for a galactic civilization to form, in which "Aryan" society will colonise the Milky Way. It advocates a spiritual path in which practitioners are required to break societal taboos by isolating themselves from society, committing crimes, embracing political extremism and violence, and carrying out acts of human sacrifice. ONA members practice magic, believing that they are able to do it by channeling energies into their own "causal" realm from an "acausal" realm where the laws of physics do not apply, and these magical actions are designed to help them achieve their ultimate goal of establishing the Imperium.

The ONA eschews any central authority or structure; instead, it operates as a broad network of associates – termed the "kollective" – who are inspired by the texts which were originally authored by Long and other members of the "inner ONA". The group is composed largely of clandestine cells, which are called "nexions".  Some academic estimates suggest that the number of individuals who are broadly associated with the Order falls in the low thousands. Various rapes, killings and acts of terrorism have been perpetrated by far-right individuals influenced by the ONA, with various British politicians and activists calling for the ONA to be proscribed as a terrorist group.

History

Origins

Academics have found it difficult to ascertain "exact and verifiable information" about the ONA's origins given the high level of secrecy in which it engages in order to shield itself. As with many other occult organisations, the Order shrouds its history in "mystery and legend", creating a "mythical narrative" for its origins and development. The ONA claims to be the descendant of pre-Christian pagan traditions which survived the Christianisation of Britain and were passed down from the Middle Ages onward in small groups or "temples" which were based in the Welsh Marches – a border area which is located between England and Wales – each of which was led by a grand master or a grand mistress. According to the Order, in the late 1960s, a grand mistress of one such group united three of these temples – Camlad, the Temple of the Sun, and the Noctulians – to form the ONA, before she welcomed outsiders into the tradition.

According to the Order's account, one of those whom the grand mistress initiated into the group was "Anton Long", an individual who described himself as a British citizen who had spent much of his youth visiting Africa, Asia, and the Middle East. Long claimed that prior to his involvement in the ONA he had been interested in occultism for several years, having contacted a coven based in Fenland in 1968, before moving to London and joining groups that practiced ceremonial magic in the style of the Hermetic Order of the Golden Dawn and Aleister Crowley. He also claimed a brief involvement in a Satanic group based in Manchester, the Orthodox Temple of the Prince run by Ray Bogart, during which time he encountered the ONA Grand Mistress. According to the Order's account, Long joined the ONA in 1973 – the first person to have done so in five years – and he became the grand mistress's heir. He later recalled that at that time the group held rituals at henges and stone circles around the solstices and equinoxes.

This account further states that when the Order's Grand Mistress migrated to Australia, Long took over as the group's new grand master. The group claimed that Long "implemented the next stage of Sinister Strategy – to make the teachings known on a large scale". From the late 1970s onward, Long encouraged the establishment of new ONA groups, which were known as "temples", and from 1976 onward he authored an array of texts for the tradition, codifying and extending its teachings, mythos, and structure. These texts are typically written in English, although they include passages of Classical Greek as well as terms from Sanskrit and Arabic, reflecting Long's fluency in such languages. After examining these texts, the historian Nicholas Goodrick-Clarke stated that in them, Long "evokes a world of witches, outlaw peasant sorcerers, orgies and blood sacrifices at lonely cottages in the woods and valleys of this area [Shropshire and Herefordshire] where he has lived since the early 1980s".

The real identity of "Anton Long" remains unknown for both members of the Order and to academics who have studied it. However, in a 1998 issue of the anti-fascist magazine Searchlight, it was claimed that "Anton Long" was a pseudonym of David Myatt, a prominent figure in the British neo-Nazi movement. Born in the early 1950s, Myatt had been involved in various neo-Nazi groups, initially serving as a bodyguard for Colin Jordan of the British Movement before joining the Combat 18 militia and becoming a founding member and leader of the National Socialist Movement. His text on A Practical Guide to Aryan Revolution, in which he advocated violent militancy in aid of the neo-Nazi cause, was cited as an influence on the nail bomber David Copeland. In 1998, Myatt converted to Islam and remained a practicing Muslim for eight years, in which time he encouraged violent jihad against Zionism and Israel's Western allies. In 2010, he announced that he had renounced Islam and was practicing an esoteric tradition that he termed the "Numinous Way".

Goodrick-Clarke supported the idea that Myatt was Long, with the religious studies scholar Jacob C. Senholt adding that "the role of David Myatt [is] paramount to the whole creation and existence of the ONA". Senholt presented additional evidence that he believed confirmed Myatt's identity as Long, writing that Myatt's embrace of neo-Nazism and radical Islamism represented "insight roles" which Myatt had adopted as part of the ONA's "sinister strategy" to undermine Western society, a view endorsed by scholar of Satanism Per Faxneld. In 2015, an ONA member known as R. Parker argued in favour of the idea that Myatt was Long. As a result of Page's publication, the sociologist of religion Massimo Introvigne stated that the ONA has "more or less acknowledged" that Myatt and Long are the same person.
Myatt himself has repeatedly denied allegations that he has any involvement with the ONA. and that he has used the pseudonym "Anton Long", Religious studies scholar George Sieg expressed concern with this association, stating that he found it to be "implausible and untenable based on the extent of variance in writing style, personality, and tone" between Myatt and Long. Jeffrey Kaplan, an academic specialist in the far right, has also suggested that Myatt and Long are separate people, while the religious studies scholar Connell R. Monette posited the possibility that "Anton Long" was not a singular individual but rather a pseudonym used by several different people.

Public emergence

The ONA arose to public attention in the early 1980s. During the 1980s and 1990s it spread its message through articles in magazines. In 1988, it began publication of its own in-house journal, titled Fenrir. Among material it has issued for public consumption have been philosophical tracts, ritual instruction, letters, poetry, and gothic fiction. Its core ritual text is titled the Black Book of Satan. It has also issued its own music, painted tarot set known as the Sinister Tarot, and a three-dimensional board game known as the Star Game. The ONA established links with other neo-Nazi Satanist groups: its international distributor was New Zealander Kerry Bolton, the founder of the Black Order, who is described as an ONA adept in the group's published letter-correspondence, and it has access to a private library of occult and far right material owned by the Order of the Jarls of Bælder. According to Monette, the group now have associates, and groups, in the United States, Europe, Brazil, Egypt, Australia, and Russia. One of these associate groups is the U.S.-based Tempel ov Blood, which has published a number of texts through Ixaxaar Press, while another is the California-based White Star Acception, which has been designated as the ONA's "Flagship Nexion" in the United States despite diverting from mainstream ONA teachings on a number of issues.

During the early 1990s, the Order stated that it was entering the second stage of its development, in which it would leave behind its prior focus on recruitment and public outreach within the occult community and that it would instead focus on refining its teachings; its resulting quietness led some occultists to erroneously speculate that the ONA had become defunct.
In 2000, the ONA established a presence on the Internet, using it as a medium to communicate with others and to distribute its writings.
In 2008, the ONA announced that it was entering the third phase in its history, in which it would once again focus heavily on promotion, utilising such social media as online blogs, forums, Facebook, and YouTube to spread its message. In 2011, the "Old Guard", a group of longstanding members of the Order, stated that they would withdraw from active, public work with the group. In March 2012, Long announced that he would be withdrawing from public activity, although he appears to have remained active in the Order.

Beliefs and structure

Monette described the ONA as "a fascinating blend of both Hermeticism and Traditional Satanism, with some pagan elements".
Faxneld described the ONA as "a dangerous and extreme form of Satanism"  and as "one of the most extreme Satanist groups in the world." Jeffrey Kaplan and Leonard Weinberg characterised it as a "National Socialist-oriented Satanist group", while Nicholas Goodrick-Clarke similarly deemed it to be a "Satanic Nazi cult" which "combine[d] paganism with praise for Hitler". He added that the ONA "celebrated the dark, destructive side of life through anti-Christian, elitist and Social Darwinist doctrines." Considering the manner in which the ONA had syncretized both Satanism and Heathenry, the historian of religion Mattias Gardell described its spiritual perspective as "a heathen satanic path". The scholar George Sieg however argued that the ONA should be categorised as "post-Satanic" because it has "surpassed (without fully abandoning) identification with its original satanic paradigm".

Traditional Satanism and paganism

The ONA describe their occultism as "Traditional Satanism". Since the establishment of the ONA, the term "Traditional Satanism" has also been adopted by Theistic Satanist groups like the Brotherhood of Satan. Faxneld suggested that the Order's adoption of the word "traditional" possibly reflected a "conscious strategy to built legitimacy" by harking back to "arcane ancient wisdom" in a manner deliberately distinct from the way in which Anton LaVey sought to gain legitimacy for his Church of Satan by appealing to rationality, science, and his own personal charisma. Elsewhere Faxneld suggested that the ONA's use of "Traditional Satanism" to differentiate themselves from the dominant forms of Satanism had comparisons with how those who describe themselves as practitioners of "traditional witchcraft" do so to distinguish their magico-religious practices from the dominant form of modern witchcraft, Wicca.
According to Jesper Aagaard Petersen, an academic specialist of Satanism, the Order present "a recognizable new interpretation of Satanism and the left-hand path", and for those involved in the group, Satanism is not simply a religion but a way of life.
The Order postulates Satanism as an arduous individual achievement of self-mastery and Nietzschean self-overcoming, with an emphasis on individual growth through practical acts of risk, prowess and endurance. Therefore, "[t]he goal of the Satanism of the ONA is to create a new individual through direct experience, practice and self-development [with] the grades of the ONA system being highly individual, based on the initiates' own practical and real-life acts, instead of merely performing certain ceremonial rituals". Thus Satanism, the ONA assert, requires venturing into the realm of the forbidden and illegal in order to shake the practitioner loose of cultural and political conditioning. Intentionally transgressive, the Order has been characterised as providing "an aggressive and elitist spirituality". Religious studies scholar Graham Harvey wrote that the ONA fit the stereotype of the Satanist "better than other groups", something which he thought was deliberately achieved by embracing "deeply shocking" and illegal acts.

The ONA are strongly critical of larger Satanic groups like the Church of Satan and the Temple of Set, whom they deem to be "sham-Satanic" because they embrace the "glamour associated with Satanism" but are "afraid to experience its realness within and external to them". In turn, the Church of Satan has criticised what they alleged was the Order's "paranoic insistence that they are the only upholders of Satanic tradition", with Kaplan stating that these comments reflect "the intramural tensions" that are common within "the world of Satanism".

Although conceiving of itself as having pre-Christian origins and describing Satanism as "militant paganism", the ONA does not advocate the re-establishment of pre-Christian belief systems, with one ONA tract stating that "all past gods of the various Western Traditions are rendered obsolete by the forces which Satanism alone is unleashing". However, Goodrick-Clarke noted that the group's "ideas and rituals" draw upon "a native tradition", with references to the pre-Christian Anglo-Saxon concept of wyrd, an emphasis on ceremonies performed at equinoxes, and the construction of incense using indigenous trees, thus suggesting the idea of "rootedness in English nature". Practitioners undergo "black pilgrimages" to prehistoric ceremonial sites in the area around Shropshire and Herefordshire in the English Midlands.
Furthermore, Monette writes that "a critical examination of the ONA's key texts suggests that the satanic overtones could be cosmetic, and that its core mythos and cosmology are genuinely hermetic, with pagan influences."

Aeonic cosmology and Nazism

The ONA states that cosmic evolution is guided by a "sinister dialectics" of alternating Aeonic energies. It divides human history into a series of Aeons, believing that each Aeon was dominated by a human civilization that emerged, evolved, and then died. It states that each Aeon lasts for approximately 2000 years, with its respective dominating human civilization developing within the latter 1500 years of that period. It holds that after 800 years of growth, each civilization faces problems, resulting in a "Time of Troubles" that lasts from between 398 and 400 years. In each civilization's final stage is a period that lasts for approximately 390 years, in which it is controlled by a strong military and imperial regime, after which the civilization falls. The ONA claims that humanity has lived through five such Aeons, each with an associated civilization: the Primal, Hyperborean, Sumerian, Hellenic, and Western. Both Goodrick-Clarke and Senholt have stated that this system of Aeons is inspired by the works of Arnold J. Toynbee, with Senholt suggesting that it might also have been influenced by Crowley's ideas regarding Thelemic Aeons.

The ONA claims that current Western civilization has a Faustian ethos and it has recently undergone its Time of Troubles, with its final stage, an "Imperium" of militaristic governance, due to commence at some point in 1990–2011 and last until 2390. This will be followed by a period of chaos from which will be established a sixth Aeon, the Aeon of Fire, which will be represented by the Galactic civilization in which an Aryan society shall colonize the Milky Way galaxy. However, the Order holds that unlike previous Aeonic civilizations, Western civilization has been infected with the "Magian/Nazarene" distorion, which they associate with the Judeo-Christian religion. The group's writings state that while Western civilization had once been "a pioneering entity, imbued with elitist values and exalting the way of the warrior", under the impact of the Magian/Nazarene ethos it has become "essentially neurotic, inward-looking and obsessed", embracing humanism, capitalism, communism, as well as "the sham of democracy" and "the dogma of racial equality." They believe that these Magian/Nazarene forces represent a counter-evolutionary trend which threatens to prevent the emergence of the Western Imperium and thus the evolution of humanity, opining that this cosmic enemy must be overcome through the force of will. Both Goodrick-Clarke and Sieg note that these ideas regarding the "Magian soul" and "cultural distortion" brought about by Jews were derived from the works of Oswald Spengler and Francis Parker Yockey.

The ONA praises Nazi Germany as "a practical expression of the Satanic spirit ... a burst of Luciferian light – of zest and power – in an otherwise Nazarene, pacified, and boring world." Embracing Holocaust denial, it claims that the Holocaust was a myth which was constructed by the Magian/Nazarene establishment in order to denigrate the Nazi administration after the Second World War and erase its achievements from "the psyche of the West". The group believes that a neo-Nazi revolution is necessary in order to overthrow the Magian-Nazarene domination of Western society and establish the Imperium, ultimately allowing humanity to enter the Galactic civilization of the future.

Accordingly, positive references to Nazism and neo-Nazism can be found within the group's written material, and it evokes the Nazi leader Adolf Hitler as a positive force in its text for the performance of a Black Mass, also known as The Mass of Heresy. However, some ONA texts state that members should embrace neo-Nazism and racism not out of a genuine belief in Nazi ideology, but as part of a "sinister strategy" to advance Aeonic evolution. A version of the Black Mass-produced by an Australian ONA group, The Temple of THEM, replaces praise of Hitler with praise of the Islamist militant Osama bin Laden, while the writings of Chloe Ortega and Kayla DiGiovanni, key publicists for the U.S.-based White Star Acception, express what Sieg termed a "left-anarchist" platform which lacked the condemnation of Zionism and the endorsement of Aryan racialism which is found in Long's writings. The Order is thus far more overtly politically extreme in its aims than other Satanic and left-hand path organisations are, seeking to infiltrate and destabilise modern society through magical and practical means.

Initiation and the Seven Fold Way

The ONA's core system is known as the "Seven Fold Way" or "Hebdomadry", and is outlined in one of the Order's primary texts, Naos. The sevenfold system is reflected in the group's symbolic cosmology, the "Tree of Wyrd", on which seven celestial bodies – the Moon, Venus, Mercury, the Sun, Mars, Jupiter, and Saturn – are located. The term wyrd was adopted from Old English, where it referred to fate or destiny. Monette identified this as a "hermetic system", highlighting that the use of seven planetary bodies had been influenced by the Medieval Arabic texts Ghāyat al-Ḥakīm and Shams I-Maarif.
The Seven Fold Way is also reflected in the group's initiatory system, which has seven grades through which the member can gradually progress. These are: (1) Neophyte, (2) Initiate, (3) External Adept, (4) Internal Adept, (5) Master/Mistress, (6) Grand Master/Mousa and (7) Immortal. The group has revealed that very few of its members raise to the fifth and sixth degrees, and in a 1989 article the ONA stated that at that point there were only four individuals who had reached the stage of Master.

The ONA does not initiate members into the group itself, but rather expects an individual to initiate themselves. It requires that initiates be in a good physical condition, and recommends a training regimen for prospective members to follow.  Newcomers are expected to take on a magical partner of the opposite sex. Thenceforth, the practitioner must undertake personal and increasingly difficult challenges in order to move through the different grades. Most of the ordeals that allow the initiate to proceed to the next stage are publicly revealed by the Order in its introductory material, as it is believed that the true initiatory element lies in the experience itself and can only be attained through performing them. For instance, part of the ritual to become an External Adept involves an ordeal in which the prospective member is to find a lonely spot and to lie there, still, for an entire night without moving or sleeping. The initiatory process for the role of Internal Adept entails the practitioner withdrawing from human society for three months, from an equinox to a solstice, or (more usually) for six months, during which time they must live in the wild without modern conveniences or contact with civilisation.  The next stage – the Ritual of the Abyss – involves the candidate living alone in a dark isolated cavern for a lunar month. According to Jeffrey Kaplan, an academic specialist of the far right, these physically and mentally challenging initiatory tasks reflect "the ONA's conception of itself as a vanguard organization composed of a tiny coterie of Nietzschean elites."

Within the initiatory system of the ONA, there is an emphasis on practitioners adopting "insight roles" in which they work undercover among a politically extreme group for a period of six to eighteen months, thus gaining experience in something different from their normal life. Among the ideological trends that the ONA suggests its members adopt "insight roles" within are anarchism, neo-Nazism, and Islamism, stating that aside from the personal benefits of such an involvement, membership of these groups has the benefit of undermining the Magian-Nazarene socio-political system of the West and thus helping to bring about the instability from which a new order, the Imperium, can emerge. However, Monette noted a potential shift in the insight roles recommended by the group over the decades; he highlighted that while the ONA recommended criminal or military activities during the 1980s and early 1990s, by the late 1990s and 2000s they were instead recommending Buddhist monasticism as an insight role for practitioners to adopt.
Through the practice of "insight roles", the order advocates continuous transgression of established norms, roles, and comfort zones in the development of the initiate ... This extreme application of ideas further amplifies the ambiguity of Satanic and left-hand path practices of antinomianism, making it almost impossible to penetrate the layers of subversion, play and counter-dichotomy inherent in the sinister dialectics." Senholt suggested that Myatt's involvement with both neo-Nazism and Islamism represent such "insight roles" in his own life.

The acausal realm, magick and the Dark Gods

The ONA believe that humans live within the causal realm, which obeys the laws of cause and effect. However, they also believe in an acausal realm, in which the laws of physics do not apply, further promoting the idea that numinous energies from the acausal realm can be drawn into the causal, allowing for the performance of magic. The ONA distinguish between external, internal, and aeonic magick. External magic itself is divided into two categories: ceremonial magick, which is performed by more than two people to achieve a specific goal and hermetic magick, which is performed either solitarily or in a pair and which is often sexual in nature. Internal magick is designed to produce an altered state of consciousness in the participant, in order to result in a process of "individuation" which bestows adepthood. The most advanced form of magick in the ONA system is aeonic magick, the practice of which is restricted to those who are already perceived to have mastered external and internal magick and attained the grade of master. The purpose of aeonic magick is to influence large numbers of people over a lengthy period of time, thus affecting the development of future aeons. In particular it is employed with the intent of disrupting the current socio-political system of the Western world, which the ONA believe has been corrupted by Judeo-Christian religion.

The ONA utilises two methods in its performance of aeonic magick. The first entails rites and chants with the intent of opening a gateway – known as a "nexion" – to the "acausal realm" in order to manifest energies in the "causal realm" that will influence the existing aeon in the practitioner's desired direction. The second method involves playing an advanced form of a board game known as the Star Game; the game was devised by the group, with the game pieces representing different aeons. The group believes that when an initiate plays the game they can become a "living nexion" and thus a channel for acausal energies to enter the causal realm and effect aeonic change. An advanced form of the game is used as part of the training for the grade of Internal Adept.

The Order promotes the idea that "Dark Gods" exist within the acausal realm, although it is accepted that some members will interpret them not as real entities but as facets of the human subconscious. These entities are perceived as dangerous, with the ONA advising caution when interacting with them. Among those Dark Gods whose identities have been discussed in the Order's publicly available material are a goddess named Baphomet who is depicted as a mature woman carrying a severed head. In addition, there are entities whose names, according to Monette, are borrowed from or influenced by figures from Classical sources and astronomy, such as Kthunae, Nemicu, and Atazoth.

Another of these acausal figures is termed Vindex, after the Latin word for "avenger". The ONA believe that Vindex will eventually incarnate as a human – although the gender and ethnicity of this individual is unknown – through the successful "presencing" of acausal energies within the causal realm, and that they will act as a messianic figure by overthrowing the Magian forces and leading the ONA to prominence in the establishment of a new society. Sieg drew comparisons between this belief in Vindex and the ideas of Savitri Devi, the prominent Esoteric Hitlerist, regarding the arrival of Kalki, an avatar of the Hindu god Vishnu, to Earth. The ONA also propagate the idea that it is possible for the practitioner to secure an afterlife within the acausal realm through their spiritual activities. It is for this reason that the final stage of the Seven Fold Way is known as the "Immortal", constituting those initiates who have been able to advance to the stage of dwelling in the acausal realm.

Human sacrifice

The ONA's writings condone and encourage human sacrifice, referring to their victims as opfers.
The ONA outlines their guidelines for human sacrifice in a number of documents: "A Gift for the Prince – A Guide to Human Sacrifice", "Culling – A Guide to Sacrifice II", "Victims – A Sinister Exposé", and "Guidelines for the Testing of Opfers". According to the ONA's beliefs, the killer must allow their victims to "self-select" themselves; this is achieved through testing victims to see whether they expose perceived character faults. If this proves to be the case, victims are believed to have shown that they are worthy of death, and the sacrifice can commence. Those deemed ideal for sacrifice by the group include individuals perceived as being of low character, members of what they deem "sham-Satanic groups" like the Church of Satan and Temple of Set, as well as "zealous, interfering Nazarenes", and journalists, business figures and political activists who disrupt the group's operations. The ONA explains that because of the need for such "self-selection", children must never be victims of sacrifice.

The sacrifice is then carried out through either physical or magical means, at which point the killer is believed to absorb power from the body and spirit of the victim, thus entering a new level of "sinister" consciousness. As well as strengthening the character of killers by heightening their connection with the acausal forces of death and destruction, such sacrifices are also viewed as having wider benefits by the ONA, because they remove from society individuals whom the group deems to be worthless human beings. Monette noted that no ONA nexion cells publicly admitted to carrying out a sacrifice in a ritual manner, but that members had joined the police and military groups in order to engage in legal violence and killing.

The ONA believe that there are historical precedents to their practice of human sacrifice, expressing belief in a prehistoric tradition in which humans were sacrificed to a goddess named Baphomet at the spring equinox and to the Arcturus star in the autumn. However, the ONA's advocacy of human sacrifice has drawn strong criticism from other Satanist groups like the Temple of Set, who deem it to be detrimental to their own attempts to make Satanism more socially acceptable within Western nations.

The term "nine angles"

Although occult scholars attribute the concept of Nine Angles to The Church of Satan, in its essays and other writings the ONA offers differing explanations as to the meaning of the term "Nine Angles". One explanation is that it pertains to the seven planets of the group's cosmology (the seven angles), added to the system as a whole (the eighth angle), and the mystic themselves (the ninth angle). A second explanation is that it refers to seven "normal" alchemical stages, with an additional two processes. A third is that it pertains to the nine emanations of the divine, a concept originally found in Medieval texts produced within the Islamic mystical tradition of Sufism. Monette further suggested that it was a reference to a classical Indian tradition which divided the Solar System into nine planets.

Organization

The ONA is a secretive organization. It lacks any central administration, instead operating as a network of allied Satanic practitioners, which it terms the "kollective". Thus, Monette stated that the Order "is not a structured lodge or temple, but rather a movement, a subculture or perhaps metaculture that its adherents choose to embody or identify with". Monette also suggested that this absence of a centralised structure would aid the Order's survival, because its fate would not be invested solely in one particular leader. The ONA dislikes the term "member", instead favouring the word "associate". In 2012, Long stated that those affiliated with the Order fell into six different categories: associates of traditional nexions, Niners, Balobians, gang and tribe members, followers of the Rounwytha tradition, and those involved with ONA-inspired groups.

The group largely consists of autonomous cells known as "nexions". The original cell, based in Shropshire, is known as "Nexion Zero", with the majority of subsequent groups having been established in Britain, Ireland, and Germany, however nexions and other associated groups have also been established in the United States, Australia, Brazil, Egypt, Italy, Spain, Portugal, Poland, Serbia, Russia and South Africa. The Greek wing of the ONA goes by the name Mirós tou Zeús. Some of these groups, such as the U.S.-based Tempel ov Blood, describe themselves as being distinct from the ONA while both having been greatly influenced by it and having connections to it.

In the ONA's terminology, the terms Drecc and Niner refer to folk-based or gang-based culture or individuals who support the Order's aims by practical (including criminal) means rather than esoteric ones. One such group is the White Star Acception, who claim to have perpetrated rapes, assaults, and robberies in order to advance the group's power; Sieg noted that the reality of these actions has not been verified.
A Balobian is an artist or musician who contributes to the group through their production of fine art. The Rounwytha is a tradition of folk-mystics deemed to exhibit gifted psychic powers reflecting their embodiment of the "sinister feminine archetype". Although a minority are men, most Rounwytha are female, and they often live reclusively as part of small and often lesbian groups.

Outer representative

Several academic commentators have highlighted the existence of a position within the ONA called an "Outer Representative", who serves as an official spokesperson for the group to the outer world. The first to publicly claim to be the group's "Outer Representative" was Richard Moult, an artist and composer from Shropshire who used the pseudonym of "Christos Beest". Moult was followed as "Outer Representative" by "Vilnius Thornian", who held the position from 1996 to 2002, and who has been identified by ONA insiders as the left-hand path ideologue Michael Ford. Subsequently, on the blog of the White Star Acception, the claim was made that the group's member Chloe Ortega was the ONA's Outer Representative, also this blog later became defunct by 2013. In 2013, a female American Rounwytha using the name of "Jall" appeared claiming to be the Order's "Outer Representative".

The existence of the position of Outer Representative and the extent of its functions have been disputed however. According to Senholt the ONA "does not award titles", with Monette writing that "there is no central authority within the ONA." Also disputed is the existence of an O9A "Old Guard". Members of this Old Guard included Christos Beest, Sinister Moon, Dark Logos, and Pointy Hat, although in 2011 they stated that they would withdraw from the public sphere.

Membership

Several academics have written about ONA membership. In a 1995 overview of British Satanist groups, Harvey suggested that the ONA consisted of less than ten members, "and perhaps fewer than five." In 1998, Jeffrey Kaplan and Leonard Weinberg stated that the ONA's membership was "infinitesmally small", with the group acting primarily as a "mail-order ministry".

In 2013, Senholt observed that because the group has no official membership, it is "difficult, if not impossible, to estimate the number of ONA members". Senholt suggested that a "rough estimate" of the "total number" of individuals involved with the ONA in some capacity from 1980 to 2009 was "a few thousand"; he had come to this conclusion from an examination of the number of magazines and journals about the subject circulated and the number of members of online discussion groups devoted to the ONA. At the same time he thought that the number of "longtime adherents is much smaller." Also in 2013, Monette estimated that there were over two thousand ONA associates, broadly defined. He believed that the gender balance was roughly equal, although with regional variation and differences among particular nexions. Introvigne observed that if Monette's estimate was correct, it would mean that the ONA is "easily... the largest Satanist organization in the world".

According to a survey in 2015, the ONA has more female supporters than either the Church of Satan or the Temple of Set; more women with children; more older supporters; more supporters who are better established in socio-economic terms; and more who politically are further to the Right.

Terrorism and crimes 

According to a report by the civil rights group the Southern Poverty Law Center the ONA "holds an important position in the niche, international nexus of occult, esoteric, and/or satanic neo-Nazi groups." Several newspapers have reported that the O9A is linked to a number of high-profile figures from the far right and that the group is affiliated and shares members with neo-Nazi terrorist groups such as Atomwaffen Division and proscribed National Action, Sonnenkrieg Division, Combat 18 and Nordic Resistance Movement (NRM).

In the summer of 1997 two members of the Swedish O9A group called Misanthropic Luciferian Order perpetrated the so-called Keillers Park murder, an alleged ritual sacrifice of an Algerian man. The men were eventually convicted of a hate crime.

On 23 September 2019, Specialist Jarrett William Smith, 24, of Fort Riley, Kansas, was charged with distributing information related to explosives and weapons of mass destruction. Assistant US Attorney Anthony Mattivi alleged in federal court that Smith distributed explosives information and was planning on assassinating federal agents with three other people "for the glory of his Satanist religion". On 10 February 2020, Smith pleaded guilty to two counts of distributing information related to explosives, destructive devices and weapons of mass destruction and was sentenced to 30 months in federal prison.

A US paratrooper named Ethan Melzer in the 173rd Airborne Brigade's Sky Soldiers, who was assigned to the 1st Battalion, 503rd Infantry Regiment, in Vicenza, Italy, in 2019 until 2020, plotted an ambush on his unit, "to result in the deaths of as many of his fellow service members as possible." He was charged in June 2020 with conspiring and attempting to murder military service members, and providing and attempting to provide material support to terrorists. The paratrooper was charged with leaking classified information (including the unit's location and security) to his co-conspirators in the RapeWaffen nexion and the Order of the Nine Angles (O9A). In June 2022 he pled guilty to three charges and is scheduled for sentencing in January 2023. On March 3, 2023, Melzer was sentenced to 45 years in prison.

After Melzer was exposed, several other active members of the US military were also discovered to be members of the O9A. Corwyn Storm Carver was found to be another member in communication with the group and in possession of O9A paraphernalia and literature while stationed in Kuwait. Shandon Simpson, member of the Ohio Army National Guard sent to quell the George Floyd protests in Washington, D.C. openly espoused neo-nazi views and was also found to be in the RapeWaffen. Simpson told that he was planning to shoot the protesters as part of "racial holy war" and was intercepted by the FBI but only after he had already been deployed.

In January 2020, O9A follower Luke Austin Lane and two accomplices were arrested for allegedly stockpiling weapons and plotting to kill an antifascist couple and their young children. In preparation Lane along with dozen other people had engaged in paramilitary training and sacrificed a ram, drank its blood and consumed psychedelic drugs in an occult ritual on his property.

The British political advocacy group Hope not Hate reported in March 2020 that there were six cases of neo-nazis connected to O9A being prosecuted for terrorist offenses during the year alone. A 2019 article in The Times newspaper stated that "a Times reporter went undercover on the gaming platform Discord to infiltrate an invitation-only Satanist neo-Nazi group called The Order of Nine Angles (O9A). The group openly encouraged acts of terrorism and celebrated what was described as esoteric Hitlerism."
In March 2020, Hope not Hate began a campaign to have the Order of Nine banned, proscribed, as a terrorist group, a campaign supported by several British members of Parliament including the Labour Party's Yvette Cooper, Chair of the Home Affairs Select Committee.

On 18 September 2020, Toronto Police arrested 34-year-old Guilherme “William” Von Neutegem and charged him with the murder of Mohamed-Aslim Zafis. Zafis was the caretaker of a local mosque who was found dead with his throat cut. The Toronto Police Service said the killing is possibly connected to the stabbing murder of Rampreet Singh a few days prior a short distance from the spot where Zafis' murder took place. Von Neutegem is a member of the O9A and social media accounts established as to belonging to him promote the group and included recordings of Von Neutegem performing satanic chants. In his home there was also an altar with the symbol of the O9A adorning a monolith. According to Evan Balgord of the Canadian Anti-Hate Network, they are aware of more O9A members in Canada, and their affiliated organization Northern Order. CAHN reported previously of the Northern Order when a member in Canadian Armed Forces was caught selling firearms and explosives to other neo-nazis.

On 11 December 2020, the UK based BitChute removed all O9A material for violating the site's anti-terror policy, citing O9A's "close connections with other proscribed organisations". The same month Yahoo News acquired a report by the US National Counterterrorism Center, the FBI and the Department of Homeland Security circulated to U.S intelligence agencies, assessing that the O9A poses a violent threat and that it plays an influential role among right-wing terror groups. The report however added that the O9A was rejected by certain groups for inciting its members to commit rape and pedophilia. In January 2021, after the 2021 storming of the United States Capitol, discussion about proscribing far-right groups was renewed by the Public Safety Minister Bill Blair, and the O9A was named by experts as one of the most dangerous groups in Canada whose proscription is a priority. In April 2021, Democratic Representative Elissa Slotkin pressed Joe Biden's administration to designate O9A as a Foreign Terrorist Organisation (FTO) in a letter to Secretary of State Antony Blinken. The Sonnenkrieg Division was officially proscribed in Australia on March 22, 2021, with its adherence to "violent white-supremacist ideology inspired by the Nazi Party and the Satanic ‘Order of Nine Angles’ movement" cited as the reason.

Canadian Armed Forces launched an internal investigation in October 2020 after a special forces soldier with the CJIRU was identified as a member of the Northern Order and Order of Nine Angles. According to the SPLC, the man is among “some pretty well-known, high-up people in these organizations" and an acquaintance of James Mason and the former Master Corporal Patrik Mathews who was previously exposed as a recruiter for the Northern Order and Base in Canada. On 1 February 2021, a Cornish man said to have been the leader of the UK branch of the Feuerkrieg Division plead guilty to 12 terrorism offences. Police had previously raided his home in 2019 for firearms and had found bomb building instructions and O9A literature.

Danyal Hussein who killed two sisters, Bibaa Henry and Nicole Smallman in a Wembley park in London was "closely associated" with the Order of Nine Angles and took part in O9A internet forum. He killed the two women to fulfill a "demonic pact". In response MP Stephanie Peacock called on the Home Secretary to proscribe the O9A. In Russia four members of the Order of Nine Angles were arrested after two confessed to ritual murders involving cannibalism in Karelia and Saint Petersburg. Two of them are also accused of large-scale drug trafficking as a large amount of narcotics was found in their home.

On 12 August 2021, Ben John was convicted of terrorist offences after an 11-month investigation by the Counter Terrorism Command. The statement by Lincolnshire police stated that "John had a wealth of white supremist and anti-Semitic material, as well as material related to the Satanist organisation called the Order of Nine Angles (ONA), which is increasingly under the focus of law enforcement." In October 2021, Facebook and Instagram banned O9A member E.A Koetting whose page had 128,000 subscribers for inciting murder. Finnish Security Intelligence Service also singled out O9A as a source of radicalization and concern in the country.

On December 4, 2021, the Finnish police arrested a five-man cell in Kankaanpää on suspicion of planning a terror attack and confiscated numerous firearms, including assault rifles, and tens of kilos of explosives. According to the Finnish media, the men adhered to the ideology of Atomwaffen, James Mason and ONA Satanism.

In November 2021 roughly two dozen federal agents in body armor arrested Angel Almeidaz for possessing illegal weapons. Additionally “The defendant has repeatedly expressed an interest in the abuse of children and abuse of animals,” wrote Assistant U.S. Attorney Chand Edwards-Balfour. According to New York Daily News Almeidaz was member of the O9A.

Sexual abuse
Allegations have been made by antifascist organisations, several British politicians and the media that the O9A condones and encourages sexual abuse, and this has been given as one of the reasons why the O9A should be proscribed by the British government. Many O9A members openly view rape as an effective way to undermine society by transgressing against its norms. White Star Acception commits rapes by their own admission and O9A texts such as "The Dreccian Way", "Iron Gates", "Bluebird" and "The Rape Anthology" recommend and praise rape and pedophilia, even suggesting rape is necessary for "ascension of the Ubermensch". According to the BBC News, "the authorities are concerned by the number of paedophiles associated with the ONA". Children at least as young as 13 have been groomed by the group.

Ryan Fleming of Yorkshire-based O9A nexion Drakon Covenant is currently in prison for the rape of a 14-year-old girl, after already having been convicted of sexual assault and torture of a minor. O9A member Andrew Dymock, who was convicted of 15 terror offences, has also been questioned by the police regarding the sexual assault of a teenage girl who had nazi and occult symbols carved on her body. In July 2020, another O9A member Jacek Tchorzewski was convicted by Harrow Crown Court for terror offences and for possessing over 500 pictures and videos depicting children as young as six being raped and necrophilia. Tchorzewski also possessed nazi and "satanist literature depicting rape and paedophilia". Tchorzewski's co-defendant Michal Szewczuk "ran a blog that encouraged the rape and torture of opponents, including small children" and was likewise sentenced to four years in prison for terror offences. Ethan Melzer also belonged to an encrypted O9A chatroom where members encouraged one another to perpetrate sexual violence and shared videos of these rapes. In November 2019, a Durham teen who according to the BBC News adheres to "occult nazism" and "influenced by the ONA, [sought] to alter himself in line with their literature" was found guilty of preparing a terrorist attack. In addition to the terror offences, he is charged with sexually assaulting a 12-year-old girl. He was eventually convicted of five sexual assaults in addition to the terror offenses.

In March 2020, a prominent O9A member and former leader of Atomwaffen Division John Cameron Denton was accused by prosecutors of possessing and sharing child pornography of sexual abuse of a young underage girl by his group, in addition to making 134 death and bomb threats against reporters and minority communities. On 2 September 2020, another member Harry Vaughan plead guilty to 14 terrorism offenses and possession of child pornography. A police search of his house uncovered videos of brutal rapes of children, documents showing how to build bombs, detonators, firearms, and "satanic, neo-nazi" ONA books advising rape and murder. In addition to this he was described in the Old Bailey as a firearms enthusiast and living with his two young sisters at the time of the arrest. Five Finns were also arrested for sexually abusing multiple children, according to the police the activities involved "nazism and satanism" and consumption of methamphetamine. In Sweden NRM affiliate and ONA adherent Alexander Andersson has been arrested and charged with two cases of "aggravated rape against children".

Angel Almeida, a 22-year-old ONA member from Queens, has been charged with sexual exploitation of minors and possession of child porn, among other alleged crimes. Almeida coerced two minors into partaking in sexual activities to create child porn, according to the Department of Justice. He allegedly sold child porn to fund distribution of ONA material. Luca Benincasa was sentenced to nine years and three months at Winchester Crown Court in January 2023. He had instructions on bomb making and was a recruiter and "prominent member" of the Feuerkrieg Division and ONA. He pleaded guilty to terrorism offences and possession of child porn.

Rapewaffen
"Rapewaffen" is a faction whose ideas have roots in Atomwaffen and in the Order of Nine Angles, and which encourages its adherents to rape white women in order to increase the number of white births. Those who subscribe to this way of thinking welcomed the Dobbs v. Jackson Women's Health Organization decision and the subsequent wave of abortion bans in the United States as helping them to achieve their goal. The ideology came to public attention following the arrest of a former U.S. Marine who had been plotting to rape women and attack a synagogue.

In Montenegro 

The Astral Bone Gnawers Lodge (commonly known as ABG Lodge) is an ONA affiliate (“nexion”) operating in the Balkans. In the ONA virtual community the ABG Lodge has a status of prominent nexion, known for their musical project Dark Imperivm, as well as for their polemical essays. They are one of the few nexions that made and published recordings of various ONA Sinister Chants.

The ABG Lodge is structured as a traditional secret society, headed by a matriarch known as the ‘Blood Mistress’. ABG Lodge reports that their founding Mistress is 'Zorya Aeterna', who is also the current driving force behind the organization. Members of the ABG Lodge claim that the lodge also draws on the hermetic traditions, and have started their own church called the Gnostic Church of Christ-Lucifer.

The Legion Ave Satan offshoot 
Russian Federal Security Services arrested a group of satanists in April 2020 in Krasnodar suspected of "public calls to carry out extremist activities", incitement to murder due to religious and racial hatred, and criminal activities against women. The police also seized occult "extremist material" during the raids. They belonged to a group called Legion Ave Satan, a chapter of the O9A, using nazi Reichsadler grasping a pentagram and sword as its symbol. On their now-banned VKontakte page, they claimed nexions all over the CIS countries, promoted O9A, and identified as followers of "Traditional Satanism" and "pre-christian faith". They first appeared in Russian media in 2018 when a teenager burned down a church in Republic of Karelia. The teenager had expressed his support for the Legion Ave Satan in VKontakte and posted pictures wearing a skull mask associated with Atomwaffen and O9A. He was sent to involuntary psychiatric treatment. The local nexion used an old poultry farm in Kondopoga for gatherings, and the group had lured children to prostitution according to Moskovskij Komsomolets. As is the case elsewhere, the group is connected to the local Atomwaffen chapter. Four Russian members of the Order of Nine Angles were arrested for ritual murders in Karelia and Saint Petersburg.

Temple ov Blood and FBI funding
In 2021, Joshua Caleb Sutter, the leader and founder of the O9A-affiliated Temple ov Blood, was revealed through court-documents to be a longtime FBI-informant. The defense-counsel for accused terrorist and Atomwaffen member Kaleb Cole found that Sutter's cooperation with the FBI began in 2003. As of 2021, he has received over $100,000 from the FBI for his work as an informant. Cole's attorneys wrote that, "The CI has been paid $78,133.20 plus an expense advance of $4,378.60 since February 7, 2018, which almost entirely coincides with his work on the investigation into Mr. Cole and Atomwaffen.”

Legacy and influence
The ONA's main influence lies not with the group itself, but with its prolific release of written material. According to Senholt, "the ONA has produced more material on both the practical and theoretical aspects of magic, as well as more ideological texts on Satanism and the left-hand path in general, than larger groups such as the Church of Satan and the Temple of Set has produced in combination [which] makes the ONA an important player in the theoretical discussion of what the left-hand path and Satanism is and should be according to the practitioners".

These writings were initially distributed to other Satanist and neo-Nazi groups, although with the development of the Internet this was also used as a medium to propagate its writings, with Monette stating that they had attained "a sizable presence in occult cyberspace", and thus become "one of the most prominent Left Hand Path groups by virtue of its public presence". Many of these writings were then reproduced by other groups. Kaplan considered the ONA to be "an important source of Satanic ideology/theology" for "the occultist fringe of National Socialism", namely neo-Nazi groups like the Black Order. The group gained increased attention following the growth in public interest in Myatt's impact on terrorist groups during the War on Terror in the 2000s. The historian of esotericism Dave Evans stated that the ONA were "worthy of an entire PhD thesis", while Senholt stated that it would be "potentially dangerous to ignore these fanatics, however limited their numbers might be".

In music and literature
ONA influence extends to some black metal bands such as Hvile I Kaos, who according to a report in the music section of LA Weekly, "attribute their purpose and themes to the philosophies of the Order of Nine Angles". The French band Aosoth is named after an O9A deity, and takes direct lyrical influence from the O9A. The album Intra NAOS by Italian band Altar of Perversion is named after the O9A essay NAOS: A Practical Guide to Modern Magick and showcases the band members' own path through the Numinous Way. Some music associated with the O9A has also been controversial; The Quietus published a series of articles during 2018 exploring the connections between far-right politics, music and the ONA. English philosopher, short-story horror writer and "the father of accelerationism" Nick Land has also promoted the group in his writings.

In the Jack Nightingale series of novels by Stephen Leather, a Satanic "Order of Nine Angles" are the leading antagonists. Similarly, a fictionalised Satanic group named the "Order of Nine Angels" appear in Conrad Jones' 2013 novel Child for the Devil. In another of his novels, Black Angel, Jones included a page titled "Additional Information" giving a warning about the Order of Nine Angles.

See also
 Accelerationism
 Joy of Satan
 Right-wing terrorism
 Terrorgram

References

Notes

Footnotes

Sources

Further reading

 
 
 

Crimes involving Satanism or the occult
Child sexual abuse in England
Cults
Neo-Nazi organizations
New religious movements
Sex gangs
Terrorism in the United Kingdom
Terrorism in the United States
Violence against women in England
Satanism and Nazism
Incidents of violence against girls